Lorna M. Mahlock (born 1968/1969) is a senior officer in the United States Marine Corps who currently serves as the Deputy Director for Combat Support for the National Security Agency's Cybersecurity Directorate. Her prior assignment was as the Director Command, Control, Communications, and Computers (C4) and the Deputy Department of the Navy Chief Information Officer of the Marine Corps. In 2018, she became the first Black woman to be nominated for promotion to brigadier general in the United States Marine Corps. Prior to being promoted to the rank of brigadier general, she served as Deputy Director of the Operations, Plans, Policies, and Operation Directorate at Headquarters, United States Marine Corps in Washington, D.C. In December of 2022, she received her second star and became the first Black female major general in the history of the Marine Corps.

Early life and education
Born in Kingston, Jamaica, Mahlock immigrated to Brooklyn, New York and enlisted in the United States Marine Corps. She was selected for the Marine Corps Enlisted Commissioning Education Program, graduated from Marquette University and was commissioned in December 1991.

Military career
Designated as an Air Traffic Control Officer, Mahlock earned certifications as a Federal Aviation Administration Tower Local Controller and a Marine Aviation Weapons and Tactics Instructor. She has commanded and led at various levels globally and in combat including but not limited to: Air Traffic Control Detachment Commander; Executive Officer 1st Stinger Battery; Director Marine Corps Instructional Management School; Air Control Officer G3 Future Operations 1st Marine Aircraft Wing; Company Commander Operation Southern Watch and Operation Iraqi Freedom 1; Operations and Executive Officer Operation Iraqi Freedom 2; Director Marine Air Command and Control System Experimental; Commanding Officer Iraqi Freedom 8; Information Management Officer; J3 Land Operations Lead and Division Executive Officer, Headquarters European Command; Marine Corps Office of Legislative Affairs and Assistant Chief of Staff G6.

In December of 2022, she received her second star and became the first Black female Major General in the US Marine Corps.

Mahlock holds a master's degree in Adult and Higher Education from the University of Oklahoma at Norman; a Master in National Security and Strategic Studies with distinction from the Naval War College, Newport, Rhode Island; a Master in Strategic Studies from the United States Army War College; and a Master Certificate in Information Operations from the Naval Postgraduate School. She is also a Higher Command and Staff Course graduate of the United Kingdom Joint Services Command and Staff College.

Awards
Mahlock's personal awards include: Legion of Merit with gold award star; Defense Meritorious Service Medal; Meritorious Service Medal with three gold award stars; Joint Service Commendation Medal with oak leaf cluster; Navy and Marine Corps Commendation Medal with two gold award stars; Joint Service Achievement Medal with two oak leaf clusters; Navy and Marine Corps Achievement Medal; and Good Conduct Medal.

References

Year of birth missing (living people)
Living people
Female generals of the United States Marine Corps
African-American female military personnel
Marquette University alumni
University of Oklahoma alumni
United States Army War College alumni
Naval Postgraduate School alumni
Naval War College alumni
Graduates of Joint Services Command and Staff College
21st-century African-American people
21st-century African-American women